Aage Grundstad (May 26, 1923 – April 8, 2012) was a Norwegian award-winning accordion player, originally from Vefsn.

Grundstad studied at the Oslo Conservatory of Music and graduated from the Veitvedt Music School. He had his solo debut on NRK in 1946, where he later had several radio concerts. He founded the club Friends of Old-Fashioned Dance (Venner av gammeldans) in Oslo with Angell Gabrielsen in 1954 and founded the Norwegian Accordionists' Association in 1971. Grundstad had his own ensemble with Knut Trøen, who studied the Norwegian figure dance (turdans) tradition, and released several albums.

Releases
 Aage Grundstad's Ensemble: Norske tur- og folkedanser / Norwegian Folk- and Figuredances (EMI, 1977)
 Aage Grundstad's Ensemble: Norske tur- og folkedanser 2 / Norwegian Folk- and Figuredances (EMI, 1981)
 Aage Grundstad's Ensemble: Norske tur- og folkedanser 3 / Norwegian Folk- and Figuredances (EMI, 1985)
 Aage Grundstad's Ensemble: Norske tur- og folkedanser 4 / Norwegian Folk- and Figuredances (EMI, 1989)

Awards and recognitions
 Defence Medal 1940–1945
 Royal Norwegian Society for Development Medal
 Rotary Paul Harris Fellow

References

External links
Aage Grundstad at DigitaltMuseum

20th-century Norwegian accordionists
Norwegian folk musicians
People from Vefsn
1923 births
2012 deaths
20th-century Norwegian male musicians
21st-century Norwegian accordionists
21st-century Norwegian male musicians
Oslo Conservatory of Music alumni